The Coca-Cola Music Hall is a live-music venue located at 250 Convention Boulevard in the neighborhood of Isla Grande in San Juan, Puerto Rico, managed by ASM Global. The Coca-Cola Music Hall is part of the T-Mobile District development at the Puerto Rico Convention District.

History
The Coca-Cola Music Hall was developed as part of a major development plan around the Puerto Rico Convention Center. Initially developed as District Live!, it was developed as a major entertainment hub, which included two live music venues, an outdoor plaza with a performing stage, retail and eating spaces and a Caribbean Cinemas movie theater. The area was officially opened as the T-Mobile District.

Construction for the T-Mobile District, along with the Coca-Cola Music Hall, began in 2016 as part of a major redevelopment that would complement the Puerto Rico Convention Center that had opened in 2005. The Coca-Cola Music Hall was described as a top class live event venue that would feature a prestigious sound system, a 75x30 LED screen and its own in-house lighting equipment that would facilitate staging for future events. At a $40 Million investment, the Coca-Cola Music Hall's construction was completed in 2020 but the opening of the venue, originally scheduled for March 2020, was held back until 2021 due to the COVID-19 pandemic. Naming rights were sold to The Coca-Cola Company in 2019 for an undisclosed amount, thus making it the first venue in Puerto Rico to sell its naming right.

Puerto Rican singer, Ednita Nazario held the inaugural event at the venue to a sold-out performance.

On March 16, 2022, the Coca-Cola Music Hall hosted the Miss World 2021 pageant, which was originally scheduled on December 16, 2021 at the José Miguel Agrelot Coliseum.

See also

José Miguel Agrelot Coliseum
Luis A. Ferré Performing Arts Center

Notes

References

External links
 

Government-owned corporations of Puerto Rico
Performing arts centers in Puerto Rico
Buildings and structures in San Juan, Puerto Rico
Establishments in Puerto Rico
Tourist attractions in San Juan, Puerto Rico
Concert halls in Puerto Rico